The women's 1000 metres in speed skating at the 1980 Winter Olympics took place on 17 February, at the James B. Sheffield Olympic Skating Rink.

Records
Prior to this competition, the existing world and Olympic records were as follows:

The following new world and olympic record was set during the competition.

Results

References

Women's speed skating at the 1980 Winter Olympics
Olymp
Skat